Edward John Pipgras (June 15, 1904 – April 13, 1964) was an American right-handed pitcher in Major League Baseball who played for the  Brooklyn Dodgers. He appeared in 5 games, going 0–1 with a 5.40 earned run average. His older brother George Pipgras was also a major league pitcher. Born in Schleswig, Iowa, he died at age 59 in Currie, Minnesota. He had two children.

External links

1904 births
1964 deaths
Major League Baseball pitchers
Brooklyn Dodgers players
Baseball players from Iowa
Pensacola Pilots players
Nashville Vols players
Allentown Dukes players
Canton Terriers players
Allentown Buffaloes players
Jersey City Skeeters players
Albany Senators players
Scranton Miners players
Harrisburg Senators players